Wenxinia marina is a Gram-negative, aerobic and heterotrophic bacterium from the genus of Wenxinia which has been isolated from sediment from the Xijiang oilfield of the South China Sea in China.

References

Alteromonadales
Bacteria described in 2007